Kheyti is an Indian startup which is the developer of a simple idea "Greenhouse-in-a-Box" which saves water and makes yield seven times higher. It offers a pioneering solution for local farmers to increase yields and the decrease cost.

History 
It was founded in late 2015 by Sathya Raghu Mokkapati, Kaushik K, Saumya, and Ayush Sharma. Kaushik Kappagantulu is the chief executive officer and Saumya is the Chief Program Officer. Now, Greenhouse-in-a-Box idea is in more than 1,000 farms. It is also partner of Bank of Baroda.

Awards 

Earthshot Prize for  Protect and Restore Nature in 2022
Cash Prize of USD 42,000 during MassChallenge in 2017 in Israel
Global Social Venture Competition in 2017
Best Sustainable Award by Government of Telangana in 2017
Kellogg Social Entrepreneurship Award in 2017

References 

Indian companies established in 2015